Goshen Township is one of thirty-seven townships in Washington County, Arkansas. As of the 2000 census, its total population was 1,656. The township contains the Town of Goshen and some surrounding unincorporated areas. Goshen Township was established in 1878.

Geography
Goshen Township was formed from parts of Richland Township and Brush Creek Township. Part of Goshen Township was given to Wyman Township near the end of the 19th century.

Cities, towns, villages
Goshen
Mayfield

Cemeteries
The township contains three cemeteries: Culwell Cemetery, Mayfield Cemetery, and Oxford Bend Cemetery.

Major routes
 Arkansas Highway 45

References

 United States Census Bureau 2008 TIGER/Line Shapefiles
 United States National Atlas

External links
 US-Counties.com
 City-Data.com

Townships in Washington County, Arkansas
Populated places established in 1878
Townships in Arkansas